Zolfaghar (named after Zulfiqar), also known as Kajami, is a class of semi-submersible fast torpedo boat operated by both naval forces of Iran.

History 
Allegedly originating from the North Korea as Taedong-B, there are reports suggesting that two boats of this class were delivered to Iran on 22 December 2002.

Design 
There is not much known confidently about these vessels. Kajami class can carry two lightweight torpedoes of unknown type. According to Jane's Fighting Ships, the vessel is likely designed for a high-speed approach towards enemy on the surface, and then submerging for almost  before using the snort mast for an attack.

References 

Fast patrol boat classes of the Navy of the Islamic Revolutionary Guard Corps
Ship classes of the Islamic Republic of Iran Navy
Semi-submersibles
Torpedo boat classes
Iran–North Korea military relations